Saint Remaclus (Remaculus, Remacle, Rimagilus; died 673) was a Benedictine missionary bishop.

Life
Remaclus grew up at the Aquitanian ducal court and studied under Sulpitius the Pious, bishop of Bourges. In 625 he became a monk at Luxeuil Abbey and was then ordained a priest. Around 631 Saint Eligius founded Solignac Abbey and sent for monks from Luxeil, including Remaclus, who became the first abbot. The abbey followed the rule as at Luxeil. Audoin wrote that Solignac quickly gained importance. It became particularly known for its silversmith's workshop.

Remaclus was then given charge as well of the abbey of Cougnon, in the duchy of Luxemburg. He served as an advisor to Sigebert III of Austrasia and persuaded him to establish the double-monastery of Malmedy in 648 and Stavelot in 650. Remaclus served as abbot of Stavelot and Malmedy. Erected as an ecclesiastical principality attached to the Holy Roman Empire, its head bore the title of Prince-Abbot.

In 650 Amandus, bishop of Maastricht, resigned his see to resume missionary work. Remaclus was appointed in his stead. He brought with him Hadelin, then abbot of Visé. His student Theodard succeeded him as abbot of the double monastery of Stavelot-Malmedy.

Inhabitants of this troubled diocese had murdered some of his predecessors. However, Remaclus successfully spread monasticism in the region. He served as the spiritual teacher to Saint Trudo, Saint Babolen, Saint Theodard of Maastricht, and Saint Lambert. Remaclus served as bishop for twelve years before resigning in favor of Theodard, and retiring to Stavelot around 662. He died at Stavelot in 664.  His relics lie in St. Sebastian Church in Stavelot. His feast day is September 3.

There is a St. Remaclus Parish Church in Cochem, Germany. The abbeys of Stavelot-Malmedy ceased to exist at the time of the French Revolution. In 1950 St. Remaclus' Priory, Wavreumont was established between Stavelot and Malmedy.

References

External links 
 Catholic Online: St. Remaclus
 Patron Saints: Remaclus
 Remaclus in Butler's Lives of the Saints: September, Alban Butler, Burns & Oates Ltd (2000), 
  Remaclus in Ökumenisches Heiligenlexikon
  Remaclus at the German Wikipedia

670s deaths
7th-century Frankish bishops
Dutch Roman Catholic saints
Dutch Benedictines
7th-century Frankish saints
Year of birth unknown
Abbots of Stavelot
Colombanian saints